

Administrative and municipal divisions

References

Omsk Oblast
Omsk Oblast